Castelar is city in Buenos Aires Province, Argentina. Castelar may also refer to:

People
 Armando Castelar (born 1955), Brazilian economist
 Emilio Castelar (1832-1899), Spanish republican politician, and a president of the First Spanish Republic

Buildings
 Casa de Castelar, settlement house in Los Angeles, California, U.S.
 Hotel Castelar, hotel in Buenos Aires, Argentina

Other
 2013 Castelar rail accident, Argentine rail disaster 
 Castelar e Nelson Dantas no País dos Generais, 2007 Brazilian documentary film
 Castelar Park, located in Badajoz, Extremadura, Spain
 Monument to Castelar (Madrid), public art in Madrid, Spain

See also
 Castela (disambiguation)
 Castellar (disambiguation)
 Castelão (disambiguation)